The Stolpersteine in Lomnice u Tišnova lists the Stolpersteine in the town Lomnice (Brno-Country District) in the South Moravian Region. Stolpersteine is the German name for stumbling blocks collocated all over Europe by German artist Gunter Demnig. They remember the fate of the Nazi victims being murdered, deported, exiled or driven to suicide.

Generally, the stumbling blocks are posed in front of the building where the victims had their last self chosen residence. The name of the Stolpersteine in Czech is: Kameny zmizelých, stones of the disappeared.

The lists are sortable; the basic order follows the alphabet according to the last name of the victim.

Lomnice u Tišnova 
The Jewish community of Lomnice u Tišnova existed since the beginning of the 18th century. But already in 1571 a "certain Jew" from Lomnice was mentioned, the first written evidence of the existence of Jewish population in the city. While in the 16th and 17th century there were only few Jews coming to Lomnice, this changed at the beginning of the 18th century. 708 Jews from Lysice were resettled in Lomnice. A first Jewish community with a prayer hall was established. Around 1800 about 80 Jewish families lived in Lomnice with about 611 persons, that was then at least half the inhabitants. In the first half of the 19th century there was also a Yeshiva, a Jewish university in the city. In 1830, the community consisted of 606 persons, more than a third of the population. Thereafter the Jewish portion of the population decreased continuously: in 1848 only 306  (20%), in 1900 merely 88 people (5%), 1930 only 30 persons (2%). A rabbi was active here until 1919. In 1929, der Jewish community was finally dissolved. After the destruction of Czechoslovakia and the German occupation, about 35 Jews from other municipalities in the region sought refuge in Lomnice. Already in autumn of 1941, however, their property was confiscated, their freedom of movement was restricted. Deportations were carried out between December 1941 and April 1942. The first transport took place on 5 December 1941 (Transport K), the last and largest from Brno on 4 April 1942 (transport Ah). The oldest person on this train was Mrs. Schiller, 86 years old, the youngest was Libuška Tuliss, not even three years old. After the war, only one Jew, Jan Líbezný, returned to Lomnice. He had lost all his relatives in Nazi concentration camps. On the occasion of the reopening of the Lomnic Synagogue in 1997, a memorial plaque for 58 victims of the Shoah was unveiled. On 17 September 2011, the first collocation of Stolpersteine took place. They were dedicated to the Liebesny family.

Dates of collocations 
The Stolpersteine in Lomnice were collocated by the artist himself on the following dates:
 6 November 2011: Josefa Uhra 231 
 14 September 2013: Josefa Uhra 198.

The Czech Stolperstein project was initiated in 2008 by the Česká unie židovské mládeže (Czech Union of Jewish Youth) and was realized with the patronage of the Mayor of Prague.

See also 
 List of cities by country that have stolpersteine
 Stolpersteine in the Czech Republic

External links

 stolpersteine.eu, Demnig's website
 holocaust.cz Czech databank of Holocaust victims
 Yad Vashem, Central Database of Shoah Victims' Names

References

Lomnice u Tišnova
Monuments and memorials